is a passenger railway station located in the city of Himeji, Hyōgo Prefecture, Japan, operated by the West Japan Railway Company (JR West).

Lines

Station layout
The station consists of two elevated opposed side platforms with the station building underneath. The station is staffed.

Platforms

History
JR West first notified the city of Himeji of its proposal to build a new station between Gochaku and Himeji in July 2010. Details of the new station were formally announced by JR West on 2 October 2015. While the most popular name voted for in the public ballot held to select the new name was actually , popular names for Himeji Castle, the second-place name of Higashi-Himeji was ultimately chosen by JR West, as this was deemed less likely to cause confusion among tourists who might mistakenly assume that the station was the closest to Himeji Castle. The total construction costs of JPY 2.7 billion were shared equally by JR West, the city of Himeji, and the national government. Higashi-Himeji Station was opened on 26 March 2016. 

Station numbering was introduced in March 2018 with Higashi-Himeji being assigned station number JR-A84.

Passenger statistics
The station was  expected to be used by an average of approximately 6,000 passengers daily. In fiscal 2019, the station was used by an average of 1413 passengers daily

Surrounding area
Hyogo Prefectural Harima Himeji General Medical Center
Himeji City Higashi Elementary School
  National Route 2
 Ichikawa River

See also
List of railway stations in Japan

References

External links

 JR West Station Official Site
 JR West press release (October 2015) 

JR Kobe Line
Stations of West Japan Railway Company
Railway stations in Himeji
Sanyō Main Line
Railway stations in Japan opened in 2016